George Burns (1896–1996) was an American comedian and actor.

George Burns may also refer to:

Business
Sir George Burns, 1st Baronet (1795–1890), Scottish shipping magnate
George Burns, 2nd Baron Inverclyde (1861–1905), owner of a Scottish shipping company

Politics
George Burns (American politician), member of the Oklahoma Senate
George Burns (Australian politician) (1869–1932), member of the Australian House of Representatives
George Burns (Queensland politician) (1845–1893), member of the Queensland Legislative Assembly

Sports
George Burns (first baseman) (1893–1978), American League baseball player
George Burns (golfer) (born 1949), American golfer
George Burns (outfielder) (1889–1966), National League baseball player
George Burns (rower) (1919–1995), New Zealand rower

Other
George Burns (British Army officer) (1911–1997), British general

See also
Burns (surname)
George Bruns (1914–1983), American film composer
George Byrne (1892–1973), English cricketer